The Tempe Streetcar, referred to as the Streetcar Line on regional transit maps, is a streetcar extension of Phoenix's Valley Metro Rail system. Construction began in 2017, and the line opened for service on May 20, 2022. It serves 14 stops across three miles of track serving various parts of the city's downtown, as well as the Tempe campus of Arizona State University, with the Valley Metro Rail main line.

Background
The Tempe Streetcar is a joint project between Valley Metro and the City of Tempe Public Works Department and consists of 14 stops, running from Dorsey Lane west on Apache Boulevard, then north on Mill Avenue. From there, it loops around Downtown Tempe along Mill and Ash avenues. The route continues along Rio Salado Parkway to Marina Heights, with possible extensions into the city of Mesa under consideration and evaluation. A transfer from light rail to the streetcar at the 3rd Street station permits travel to Gammage Memorial Auditorium at Arizona State University to the south and the Hayden Ferry and Marina Heights office complexes to the north.

Construction cost approximately $200 million and will be funded using the Proposition 400 sales tax and federal grants. In February 2016, the project was identified in President Barack Obama's budget for Fiscal Year 2017. A total of $75 million was dedicated to the project and would supplement the Proposition 400 funds, as well as local funds and other federal grant funds. The final 2017 budget, approved in May 2017 under President Donald Trump, included $50 million.

History

Design
In December 2016, Valley Metro selected Stantec Consulting Services for design work to be completed in 2017, allowing construction to start later in the year.  Stantec has designed other streetcar projects in the United States and contributed to the design of the Valley Metro light rail system. In May 2018, the design was finalized.

The streetcar was designed to be able to travel on the light rail line and to use those tracks to travel to the Operations & Maintenance Center.

Construction
Construction began on June 1, 2017, with utility relocation, which made way for tracks to be laid. In August 2018, Valley Metro received approval from the Federal Transit Administration (FTA) to begin the initial phase of significant construction on the Tempe Streetcar. With this approval, Valley Metro began work this fall on building the system's rail trackway, power systems and street improvements.

The line opened for service on May 20, 2022.

Rolling stock
In 2011, Kinki Sharyo offered a demonstration model of its ameriTRAM vehicle, to allow members of the public to provide feedback on the vehicle.

Valley Metro issued an RFP (request for proposals) to obtain vehicles for this route in the summer of 2016. Potential suppliers originally included Alstom, Bombardier, CAF USA, Kinki Sharyo, Siemens and TIG/m. Vehicle options for this line included a combination of battery power, overhead catenary or on-board hydrogen fuel system.

Brookville Equipment Corporation was awarded the $33 million contract for six Liberty Streetcars in 2017. The first streetcar vehicle was delivered on March 14, 2021.

Stations
The Tempe Streetcar has a total of 14 stops.

See also
Streetcars in North America
Valley Metro Rail

References

External links

 

Valley Metro Rail
Tempe, Arizona
Transportation in Tempe, Arizona
Streetcars in Arizona
Railway lines opened in 2022
Tram transport
Town tramway systems by city